Dardania, Dardanian or Dardanians may refer to ancient peoples or locations.

People
 Dardani, an ancient tribe in the Balkans
 Dardanians (Trojan) (Dardanoi), a people closely related to the Trojans and believed to be related to the Dardani
 Bato of Dardania (ruled c. 206–176 BC), Illyrian king of the Dardanian State
 Capys of Dardania, king of Dardania during the Iliad and Aeneid
 Cleitus of Dardania (ruled c. 356–335 BC), Illyrian ruler
 Erichthonius of Dardania, king of Dardania in Greek mythology
 Ilus of Dardania, king of Dardania in Greek mythology
 Monunius of Dardania (ruled c. 176–167 BC), Illyrian king of the Dardanian State

Places
 Kingdom of Dardania, an ancient kingdom in the Balkans established by the Dardani 
 Dardania (Roman province), a Roman and Byzantine province in the Balkans
 Dardania (Troad), a city and a district of the Troad, in Asia Minor on the Hellespont (the modern Dardanelles)
 Dardania (Samothrace), old name of Samothrace according to Pausanias

Other
 Democratic League of Dardania (Lidhja Demokratike e Dardanisë), a political party in Kosovo
 KF Dardania

See also
Dardan (disambiguation)